Rudi Cossey (born 2 August 1961) is a Belgian football coach. He was assistant coach of KSC Lokeren OV from 1995 to 2007, and in this team, he could also take a few times the responsibility of the interim head coach. Later on, he was coach of OH Leuven and Mons. In the summer of 2010, he returned to Lokeren as assistant coach. Cossey then became assistant consecutively at Gent in 2015, Genk in 2016, Club Brugge in 2017, Cercle Brugge in 2019, Antwerp in 2020 and Charleroi in 2022.

References 
 Rudi Cossey on the former RWDM players page
 Cossey resigns at OHL

1961 births
Belgian football managers
Belgian footballers
Club Brugge KV players
K.S.C. Lokeren Oost-Vlaanderen managers
K.S.C. Lokeren Oost-Vlaanderen players
Living people
Oud-Heverlee Leuven managers
R.W.D. Molenbeek players
R.A.E.C. Mons managers
Association footballers not categorized by position